The Fateh-110 ( "conqueror"), also known as NP-110 is an Iranian solid-fueled surface-to-surface ballistic missile produced by Iran's Aerospace Industries Organization since 2002. It is single-stage, road-mobile and can carry high-explosive warhead up to 500 kg. It was developed into four generations successively improving range and accuracy. In the latest version, it has a range of 300 km and a "pinpoint accuracy" (a CEP below 10m).

The Fateh-110 was developed from Iran's Zelzal-2 unguided artillery rocket essentially through adding a guidance system. The Fateh-110 is also license-built in Syria as the M-600. The missile has been used in the Syrian Civil War by Iran and Syria. In addition to its confirmed use by these two countries, it is widely reported that the Fateh-110 has been exported to Hezbollah in Lebanon.

Development
After the Iran–Iraq War, Iran found out that it needed an accurate short-range missile, as its Zelzal and Naze'at rockets were unguided rockets and very inaccurate. Thus, 200 Chinese CSS-8 short-range missiles were bought in 1989. But those missiles did not satisfy Iranians because of their short range, relatively light warhead and bulky structure. So a project was assigned to Shahid Bagheri Industries to design and produce a guided short-range missile.

Development began in 1995 and Zelzal 2 was chosen for the basis of the missile. Reportedly Syria also joined the program and produced its version called M-600. In 2006 the US Department of the Treasury accused Great Wall Industry, a Chinese corporation and its partners for playing a lead role in the development of the Fateh missile system, as Iran had no previous experience with solid fuelled ballistic missiles. The first tests, which occurred in 2002, were successful, and the missile was put into production.

Design 
The Fateh-110 has three sets of fins. Four at the end of it near the exhaust, four other triangular shaped fins just above them and four small ones in front of missile near the nosecone. Of the three sets of fins on the missile, only the front ones are movable.

Transport 

The Fateh-110 is road-mobile. It uses three different transporter-erector-launchers (TELs). The first one has a similar mechanism with SA-2 and is based on a Mercedes-Benz 6x6 truck. The second TEL is also used by newer versions of Zelzal rockets and again uses the Mercedes-Benz platform. The third one is an indigenous TEL called Zolfaghar that is able to carry two missiles instead of one.

Variants

First generation

The first generation of the Fateh-110 had a range of 200 km. It was flight tested in September 2002, began mass production shortly thereafter and entered service.

Second generation
In September 2004, the second generation Fateh-110 was unveiled, with the range improved to 250 km. This version appears to be offered for export.

Third generation
In 2010, the third generation Fateh-110 was tested by Iran. Iranian defense minister Ahmad Vahidi stated that accuracy, range, reaction time and storage capability in different parts of the country are increased. After that Iranian TV provided footage of the test and the impact. Some time later, it was delivered to IRGC. The range of the missile was stated as 300 km.

Fourth generation

In August 2012 Iran successfully test-fired the fourth generation Fateh-110. The fourth generation improved the accuracy.

M-600 
It seems, as of 2008, that the Syrian M-600 is based on the second generation Fateh-110. In 2010 the Israeli press claimed that Syria has given hundreds of M-600 missiles to Hezbollah.

Anti-ship ballistic missile variants
In 2011, Iran unveiled the Khalij Fars anti-ship ballistic missile. It is clearly based on the Fateh-110 and shares the range of 300 km with the third version.

In 2017 Iran showed a test-fire of the Hormoz-2 missile, saying it destroyed a 6 m target from 250 km away. Iranian news described the Hormoz-2 as an anti-ship ballistic missile and an anti-radiation missile.

Another anti-ship version with a 700-km range and designated Zolfaghar Basir was presented in September 2020.

Zolfaghar

The Zolfaghar is an Iranian tactical ballistic missile believed to be based in the Fateh-110 family and the first ballistic missile of any sort openly used by Iran in a foreign conflict. Unlike the other members of the Fateh-110 family, which are often described as quasi-ballistic missiles, the Zolfaghar flies a true ballistic trajectory. The missile's claimed range of 700 km is considered largely true based on the 2017 Deir ez-Zor missile strike; this apparently results from replacing the metal body of the Fateh-110 with composite, saving substantial weight. However, doubts have been raised about its reliability and accuracy, and Jane's assesses that the Zolfaghar's performance is poor.

The Zolfaghar (and possibly other members of the Fateh-110 family) are believed to use commercial GNSS systems to improve accuracy. Zolfaghar serial numbers may begin "ZB–".

Fateh Mobin

In 2018, Iran unveiled the Fateh Mobin guidance kit, an upgrade for Fateh-110 missiles. According to Iranian Defence Minister Amir Hatami, it can be retrofitted to members of the Fateh-110 family up to the Zolfaghar. The Fateh Mobin is believed to be an infrared imaging sensor for terminal guidance.

Fath-360 (BM-120)
It was first shown in a military exhibition on August 21, 2020 under the name of Fath. In September 2022, Iran tested the Fath 360 (and its export model called BM-120), the downsized member of the Fateh ballistic missile family. Two, four, or six-round canisters can be mounted on a truck-based launcher.

Table

Operational history

Iran
As of 2017, Iran is assessed as having less than 100 launchers for all Fateh-110 variants.
Iran used the Fateh-110B against Kurdish dissidents in Iraq in 2018. It is believed that during the January 8, 2020 missile attack of the US military bases in Iraq, Iran used the Fateh-110 missile.

Syria 
On 3 and 5 May 2013, Israel said it had hit a shipment of Fateh-110 in Syria that were "destined for Hezbollah". Israel said it would not tolerate "game changing weapons" falling into the hands of Hezbollah. On 18 May Israeli media claimed that the Syrian army had aimed a battery of Tishreen missiles, Syria's version of Iran's Fateh-110, at Tel Aviv according to reconnaissance satellites. These missiles are believed to see possible use as a deterrent against further Israeli airstrikes on Syrian targets.

According to two unnamed U.S. military officials, the Syrian Government fired at least two Fateh A-110 missiles in late December 2012. The firing of these missiles appeared to be an effort to more precisely target Syrian rebels.

In late November 2014, Iranian and Lebanese sources confirmed that Hezbollah had received Iranian Fateh-110 guided ballistic missiles and inducted them into their missile arsenal.  With a  range, Fateh-110 missiles fired from Lebanon could hit targets anywhere in Israel up to the northern Negev.  Israel has regarded deliveries of such missiles as justification for preemptive response, as the previous year it attacked missile shipments, transport convoys, and storage sites in Syria and Lebanon to prevent these and other missile types from being acquired by Hezbollah.

Iraq

Fateh-110 missiles were allegedly used in the Erbil missile strikes.

Operators

State-operators

Non-state operators
  Hamas – According to Iranian military officials, Iran delivered dozens of Fateh-110 missiles to Hamas and provided them with advanced rocket training.
 Hezbollah – It is widely reported that Iran delivered hundreds of Fateh-110 missiles to Hezbollah in Lebanon.

Future operators 

  – An intelligence assessment shared in October 2022 with Ukrainian and U.S. officials contends that Iran’s armaments industry is preparing a first shipment of Fateh-110 and Zolfaghar missiles to Russia. According to some secret evidences, Iranian military companies in Yazd province dispatched more than 200 missiles to Russian army. The sale was confirmed by the Iranian side later in October.

See also 
 Islamic Republic of Iran Armed Forces
 Defense industry of Iran
 List of military equipment manufactured in Iran
 Islamic Revolutionary Guard Corps Aerospace Force
 Zelzal-2
 Zelzal-3
 Fateh-313
 Raad-500 (missile)
 Fajr-5
 Science and technology in Iran
 Fath-360

References

External links
 CSIS Missile Threat – Fateh 110
 Info Page on Fatah 110 by Israel Missile Defense Association 
 The Middle East Missile Monitor: FATEH-110

Weapons of Syria
Short-range ballistic missiles of Iran
Surface-to-surface missiles of Iran
Tactical ballistic missiles of Iran
Theatre ballistic missiles
Military equipment introduced in the 2000s